This is a list of singles which have reached number one on the Irish Singles Chart in 1986.

 27 Number Ones
 Most weeks at No.1 (song): "The Lady in Red" - Chris de Burgh (7)
 Most weeks at No.1 (artist): Chris de Burgh (7)
 Most No.1s: Madonna (3)

See also 
 1986 in music
 Irish Singles Chart
 List of artists who reached number one in Ireland

1986 in Irish music
1986 record charts
1986